Chris B. Jensen (born October 28, 1963) is a Canadian retired professional ice hockey centre who played 74 games over six seasons in the National Hockey League (NHL) for the New York Rangers and Philadelphia Flyers. Jensen was born in Fort St. John, British Columbia, but grew up in Salmon Arm, British Columbia.

External links
 

1963 births
Canadian ice hockey right wingers
Colorado Rangers players
Hershey Bears players
Ice hockey people from British Columbia
Kalamazoo Wings (1974–2000) players
Living people
Long Beach Ice Dogs (IHL) players
Manitoba Moose (IHL) players
Minnesota Moose players
New Haven Nighthawks players
New York Rangers draft picks
New York Rangers players
People from Fort St. John, British Columbia
People from Salmon Arm
Philadelphia Flyers players
Portland Pirates players
North Dakota Fighting Hawks men's ice hockey players
Wheeling Nailers players